Brotherhood (Danish: Broderskab) is a 2009 Danish film written by Rasmus Birch and Nicolo Donato, directed by Donato and produced by Per Holst.

Plot
Lars (Thure Lindhardt) leaves the Danish army after anonymous accusations of having made passes at some of his men prevent his promotion to a higher rank. Disillusioned, and angry at his overbearing social democrat politician mother, he falls in with a Neo-Nazi group and, after initial uncertainty, joins and is taken up as a promising new recruit. Lars then discovers the Nazis are homophobic as well as racist and practice gay-bashing. He and his homophobic peer Jimmy (David Dencik) become comrades then friends, moving from hostility through grudging admiration to friendship and finally a secret love affair of tenderness and passion.

Jimmy's emotionally unstable younger brother Patrick (Morten Holst), who is already jealous that newcomer Lars quickly advanced above him in the pecking order within the Nazi group, discovers their relationship. Tormented and angry, he informs on them to leader Michael (Nicolas Bro). The whole group seek out Lars, and force Jimmy at knifepoint to beat him viciously. But after the vicious attack Jimmy stays with Lars and takes him to the isolated Nazi safe house they had been sharing. The two resolve to leave the Brotherhood and escape, but just as they are hastily packing the car to flee, a gay man whom Jimmy had beaten savagely in a Nazi group queer-bashing expedition, shown in the movie's opening scene, emerges from the dark and stabs him.

The movie ends with Jimmy lying unconscious in a hospital bed, Lars holding his hand, their fates unclear.

Cast
 Thure Lindhardt as Lars
 David Dencik as Jimmy
 Nicolas Bro as Michael, often called "Tykke" ("Fatty")
 Morten Holst as Patrick
 Anders Heinrichsen as Lasse

Awards
In 2009 Broderskab won the award for Best Film at the International Rome Film Festival.

Brotherhood won the 2012 "Berlin's Favourite Award" at the Favourites Film Festival in Berlin.

References

External links
 
 

2009 films
2000s Danish-language films
2009 drama films
Danish drama films
Danish LGBT-related films
LGBT-related drama films
2009 LGBT-related films
Gay-related films
Neo-Nazism in Denmark
Films about neo-Nazis